In radiology, the thumbprint sign, or thumbprinting, is a radiologic sign found on a radiograph that suggests the diagnosis of either epiglottitis or intestinal ischemia. 

In a lateral C-spine radiograph, the sign is caused by a thickened free edge of the epiglottis, which causes it to appear more radiopaque than normal, resembling the distal thumb.

In an abdominal radiography, thumbprinting has an appearance of thumbs protruding into the intestinal lumen, and is caused by thickened edematous mucosal folds. Abdominal thumbprinting is a non-specific finding, though one potential cause is intestinal ischemia.

References

External links
 Thumbprint sign on plain film

Radiologic signs
Respiratory system imaging